The Limburg–Altenkirchen railway is a 65.1 km long branch line from Limburg via Westerburg to Altenkirchen and connecting via the Engers–Au railway to Au through the Westerwald. The line is also known in German as the Oberwesterwaldbahn (Upper Westerwald Railway). It runs through the German states of Hesse and Rhineland-Palatinate.

Operations and history
In 1845, there were early plans to build a rail link between Frankfurt and Wiesbaden and Cologne. In 1848/49, a group was formed that advocated the construction of this line through the Westerwald. These plans were initially given some positive attention by the policy makers of Prussia and the Duchy of Nassau, but were rejected in 1853 and a licence was issued to build the East Rhine Railway instead.

In 1861, several local committees in Prussia and Nassau, published a publication supporting the construction of a "Main-Lahn-Sieg Railway", connecting Frankfurt and Cologne via the shortest route and also contributing to the development of mineral deposits (such as basalt and clay) in this area.

On 17 February 1868 the Prussian parliament passed a law that among other things, authorised the construction of a line from Limburg to Hadamar. It was built to plans developed by Moritz Hilf and opened on 1 January 1870.

On 4 December 1873 the Hessian Ludwig Railway (Hessische Ludwigsbahn, HLB) was awarded a licence to continue the line towards Troisdorf on the Sieg via Hachenburg, where a branch line to Wissen was proposed. In 1872, it had been decided to build the Main-Lahn Railway (Main-Lahn-Bahn) from Frankfurt to Limburg via Idstein, Camberg and Eschhofen. The HLB undertook the first survey and preparatory work on the extension towards Troisdorf, but further work was stopped due to financial problems. In May 1879, the Royal Railway Division (KED) of Wiesbaden received permission to continue the construction.

At the end of 1882, construction of the line to Altenkirchen was begun and the section between Altenkirchen and Hachenburg was opened on 1 April 1885. The line between Hachenburg and Hadamar was opened on 1 October 1886.

On 21 May 1883 it was finally decided the build the remaining portion from Altenkirchen to Au. This section was opened on 1 February 1887 and thus connected with the Giessen–Deutz railway towards Cologne.

The laying of a second track on the original section between Staffel and Limburg was completed on 10 December 1888.

Until 1920 
Under the Prussian state railways, the line was originally served by class T3 and T8 steam locomotives and from 1912 by class T16 locomotives.

Deutsche Reichsbahn period 
From 1924, Deutsche Reichsbahn operated class T14 locomotives on the line. During the Second World War locomotives of classes 38, 42, 55, 56 and 57 also operated in the Westerwald.

Post-war period 
Apart from the already mentioned classes, Deutsche Bundesbahn operated steam locomotives of classes 50, 52 and 82. The use of steam engines ended on 31 May 1975.

Local passenger services between Limburg and Au were operated mainly with class VT 95 and VT 98 railbuses. After 1989 the line was served by class 628 diesel multiple units. Some services from the 1950s were also operated with accumulator railcars of classes 515 and 517.

From the summer of 1953, two pairs of express services were introduced on the line between Frankfurt and Cologne, which were known in railway jargon and popularly as “hedgerow expresses” (Heckeneilzug). They were the fastest passenger services in the Westerwald. This services were discontinued with the introduction of the timetable of summer 1989. The “hedges expresses” were first operated with class VT 25 diesel multiple units and later by carriages hauled by diesel locomotives of classes V80, V100 and 216. Between the summer of 1977 and the winter of 1991 another pair of express trains also operated between Altenkirchen and Mainz and Wiesbaden.

In 1987, a siding was built for transporting tanks to and from Wäller barracks in Westerburg. This siding was closed with the closure of the base in 2007.

1990s 

After the privatisation of Deutsche Bahn on 1 January 1994, operations on the line between Limburg and Au were taken over by DB Regio AG. There were still operated with class 628 diesel multiple units as Regionalbahn services.

Since 2004 

After the contract for operations was awarded by the Zweckverband Schienenpersonennahverkehr Rheinland-Pfalz Nord (Purpose association for passenger transport association of northern Rhineland-Palatinate), management of operations were taken from 10 January 2003 by the Rhein-Main-Verkehrsverbund (Rhine-Main Transport Association, RMV) and the operation of services on the Limburg–Au route was contracted from 12 December 2004 to vectus Verkehrsgesellschaft.

Trains run from Limburg to Altenkirchen and from there to Au. All passenger service have to stop and reverse in Altenkirchen station, as the line which continues on the other side of the station line to Siershahn is only used for freight services.

On 31 October 2012, the result of a tender for future services was announced. The Hessische Landesbahn (HLB) was awarded the contract for the operation of the network from August 2015 until December 2030, including the RB 90 service (Westerwald-Sieg-Bahn). Since the existing contract with the incumbent operator was due to end in December 2014, HLB agreed to take over operations early. At the timetable change of 14 December 2014, HLB took over operations on the line not only of DreiLänderBahn from DB Regio NRW, but also the operations of the RB 28 and RB 29 services from vectus Verkehrsgesellschaft. Services remained at the old level.

Due to delays in planning, infrastructure measures could not be completed in time for the timetable change in December 2015. Therefore, a transition timetable was implemented, which provides for a break in operations for most trains in Westerburg. In the northern part, which is the responsibility of SPNV Nord and NWL, the trains already ran hourly to Siegen, as provided for in the new timetable concept. In the southern part, which is mostly in the area of responsibility of the RMV, the old timetable still operates, which provides only a two-hourly regular-interval services with some additional services. The breaks that occur in Westerburg often cause waits of 24–39 minutes for the other train, which are very unattractive for passengers. The full implementation of the new timetable was initially not expected before December 2017, but is now expected to be delayed until 2022.

Notes

References

External links 

 

Railway lines in Hesse
Railway lines in Rhineland-Palatinate
Westerwald
Railway lines opened in 1870
1870 establishments in Germany
Railways with Zig Zags